Egon von Neindorff (12 September 1892 – 15 April 1944) was a German general during World War II. He was a recipient of the Knight's Cross of the Iron Cross with Oak Leaves of Nazi Germany.

World War II
On 1 July 1942 Neindorff took command of Fortress Brigade 1 in Crete. From September 1942 he commanded the 189th Reserve Division, and on 1 December 1942 was promoted to major-general.  On 1 May 1943 Neindorff became commander of the 356th Infantry Division in Toulon, on 5 October 1943 he took over command of the 216th Infantry Division in Orel, on 20 October 1943 he commanded the 137th Infantry Division in Gomel, and from 16 December 1943 the 6th Infantry Division south of Gomel. From 17 January 1944 Neindorff led the 36th Infantry Division in Bobruisk.

On 22 January 1944 he became commander of the German garrison at Tarnopol. In March–April 1944, it was encircled by Soviet forces. Hitler had declared Tarnopol a fortified strong point, to be held to the last man. A German relief attempt was mounted on 11 April, but fell short of its goal. Neindorff was killed in action on 15 April; organized resistance quickly collapsed. The garrison of about 4,600 was lost with only 55 men reaching German lines the next day.

Awards and decorations
 Iron Cross (1914)
 2nd Class
 1st Class
 Clasp to the Iron Cross (1939) 1st Class (2 April 1944)
 Knight's Cross of the Iron Cross with Oak Leaves
 Knight's Cross on 4 April 1944 as Generalmajor and commander of the garrison at Tarnopol
 Oak Leaves on 17 April 1944 as Generalmajor and combat commander of Tarnopol

References

1892 births
1944 deaths
Military personnel from Koblenz
Recipients of the Knight's Cross of the Iron Cross with Oak Leaves
German Army personnel of World War I
Military personnel from Rhineland-Palatinate
Major generals of the German Army (Wehrmacht)
Recipients of the clasp to the Iron Cross, 1st class
German Army personnel killed in World War II
People from the Rhine Province
Reichswehr personnel
German untitled nobility
German Army generals of World War II